Raney '81 is an album by jazz guitarist Jimmy Raney with his son, Doug Raney, that was released by Criss Cross Jazz in 1981. The album was the first release for the label and the CD release added six alternative takes.

Reception 

Scott Yanow of AllMusic states "Together they perform one original and six standards in light but forcefully swinging style. The interplay between the two guitarists is a major plus".

Track listing 
 "What Is This Thing Called Love?" (Cole Porter) – 5:40
 "This Is New" (Kurt Weill, Ira Gershwin) – 6:01
 "My Shining Hour" (Harold Arlen, Johnny Mercer) – 4:55
 "Peri's Scope" (Bill Evans) – 5:15
 "Sweet and Lovely" (Gus Arnheim, Jules LeMare, Harry Tobias) – 6:29
 "Chewish Chive and English Brick" (Jimmy Raney) – 4:49
 "If I Should Lose You" (Ralph Rainger, Leo Robin) – 6:40
 "What Is This Thing Called Love?" [alternate take] (Porter) – 5:40 Bonus track on CD release
 "Peri's Scope?" [alternate take] (Evans) – 5:27 Bonus track on CD release
 "My Shining Hour" [alternate take] (Arlen, Mercer) – 5:02 Bonus track on CD release
 "Sweet and Lovely?" [alternate take] (Arnheim, LeMare, Tobias) – 6:32 Bonus track on CD release
 "If I Should Lose You?" [alternate take] (Rainger, Robin) – 6:38 Bonus track on CD release
 "Chewish Chive and English Brick?" [alternate take] (Jimmy Raney) – 4:48 Bonus track on CD release

Personnel 
Jimmy Raney, Doug Raney – guitar
Jesper Lundgaard – bass
Eric Ineke – drums

References 

Jimmy Raney albums
Doug Raney albums
1981 albums
Criss Cross Jazz albums